Miroslaw Balka (born 16 December 1958) is a Polish contemporary sculptor and video artist.

Life and career
Balka was born in Warsaw in 1958. He graduated from the Warsaw Academy of Fine Arts in 1985.

From 1986 to 1989, Balka worked in the group Consciousnes Neue Bieriemiennost.
 
He was the 1991 winner of the Mies van der Rohe Stipendium from the Kunstmuseum Krefeld and he is a member of Akademie der Künste, Berlin. Balka runs the Spatial Activities Studio at the Warsaw Academy of Fine Arts.

In 2009, Balka installed How It Is, the 10th Unilever Series commission for the Turbine Hall at Tate Modern, London, which opened on 13 October of that year.

He currently works in Otwock and Warsaw, Poland.

Work 

The work of Mirosław Bałka is interdisciplinary but centres around sculpture and installation. The sculptor's work is influenced by family background: his grandfather was a gravestone cutter while his father engraved names on tombstones. The themes of many works revolve around historical traumatic events and memories, particularly the memory of World War II.

Initially Bałka created figurative works; later the artist shifted towards more abstract, monumental forms. These remained related to the subject of the human existence - the body in life, death and decay, personal and collective memory. The artist frequently uses steel, cement, salt, foam rubber and felt in his sculptures.

He designed the scenery for Paweł Mykietyn's composition: The Magic Mountain (opera, 2015) and Herr Thaddäus (2017).

Collections

Hirshhorn Museum, Washington DC
Moderna Galerija, Ljubliana
Museum of Contemporary Art, Los Angeles
Museum of Modern Art, New York
Museu Serralves, Porto
Muzeum Sztuki, Łódź
SFMOMA, San Francisco
Tate Modern, London 
Art Institute of Chicago
The Israel Museum, Jerusalem 
The National Museum of Art, Osaka 
Van Abbemuseum, Eindhoven 
Center of Contemporary Art, Warsaw
Tel Aviv Museum of Art
National Museum, Wrocław
Eyes of Purification at the Museum of Contemporary Art, Zagreb

References

External links
Official web site
Miroslaw Balka's solo exhibition at White Cube Mason's Yard London, review by art critic Kostas Prapoglou for Aesthetica Magazine, May 2014

1958 births
Polish contemporary artists
Artists from Warsaw
Academy of Fine Arts in Warsaw alumni
20th-century Polish sculptors
Polish male sculptors
20th-century Polish male artists
21st-century Polish male artists
Living people